Cheeseface (1968/1969  1976) was a dog who featured on the famous "Death" issue of the National Lampoon magazine, released January 1973. The cover, photographed by Ronald G. Harris, showed the dog with a gun pointed to his head, and the caption "If You Don't Buy This Magazine, We'll Kill This Dog". The cover was voted #7 in the Top 40 Magazine Covers of the Last 40 Years by the American Society of Magazine Editors.

In early 1976, Cheeseface was shot on the farm where he lived with his owner, Jimmy De Pierro, in East Charleston, Vermont, by an unnamed hunter. , the identity and motivation of the assailant remain unknown although the owners of Cheeseface named David Bradshaw in a lawsuit in 1976.

References

Individual dogs
National Lampoon (franchise)
1976 animal deaths
Black comedy